Fitzroy Place (Colorado) - NHRP building in Denver, Colorado
 Fitzroy Place (London) - office, residential and retail estate in Fitzrovia, London